International Tourism Management is a degree course, whose main focuses with regard to contents consist of business basics with a tourism covering, cross cultural and social competence as well as leadership- and professional competence.

International management

International Management deals with the maintenance and development of a multinational operation across national borders, whose manager has the knowledge and the skills to manage and handle cross-cultural processes, stakeholders and environments in a right way.

Tourism management
see Tourism management

Programs Offered 
The Hong Kong Polytechnic University
Bremen University of Applied Sciences
Karlshochschule International University 
Kasetsart University
Westcoast University of Applied Sciences
University of Applied Sciences Saarland
International University of Applied Sciences Bad Honnef - Bonn
University of the West Indies St. Augustine  Campus (UWI)
deggendorf institute of technology pfarrkirchen (Germany)

Comparison of the course characteristics of all universities

References

External links
http://www.iubh.de/en/bachelor/tourismmanagement.php?p_id=1825
http://www.hs-bremen.de/internet/de/studium/stg/istm/index.html
http://www.karlshochschule.de/deutsch/mein-studium/internationales-tourismusmanagement.html
https://web.archive.org/web/20090510080753/http://www.fh-westkueste.de/startseite/fachbereiche/wirtschaft/studium/bachelor-international-tourism-management.html
http://www.htw-saarland.de/bewerber/studienangebot/bachelor/internationales_tourismus-managment.html

Hospitality management
Management education
Education in Germany